Inclusionism (inclusion+-ism) may refer to:

 The Gospel of Inclusionism - a controversial theological concept related to universal reconciliation, proposed by Carlton Pearson
 Deletionism and inclusionism in Wikipedia